Steven Morris (born April 14, 1986 in New Orleans, Louisiana) is an American-born Honduran footballer who last played for Motagua New Orleans in the Elite Amateur Gulf Coast Premier League.

Career

Youth
Morris spent his childhood in Central America - in Honduras, El Salvador and Guatemala - before moving to Florida with his parents in 1999 at the age of 14. After high school, Morris chose not to play college soccer, and instead returned to Honduras in 2005 to play professional football. He was signed as a forward for Marathón Reservas in the Liga Nacional de Ascenso de Honduras. After a year with Marathón he transferred to Aguilas del Motagua in 2006 as an attacking right defender.

Professional
Morris was promoted by F.C. Motagua head coach Ramón Maradiaga to the senior team in 2007. His made his debut for Motagua in a friendly against the Haiti national football team in Orlando, Florida in June 2007, and also played in an exhibition game against Chivas Guadalajara in Houston, Texas.

Morris was a member of the Motagua squad that won the Copa Interclubes UNCAF 2007, but suffered an ankle injury shortly thereafter, which sidelined him for the 2008–2009 Apertura season. Morris was released by mutual consent from Motagua in January 2009, and  returned to the United States.

Having been unable to secure a professional contract, Morris signed with the Bradenton Academics of the USL Premier Development League for the 2009 season, winning the Southeastern Division, Southern Conference and advancing to the National Final Four semi finals.

After spending the first part of the 2010 season with Bradenton, Morris transferred to Bradenton's PDL rivals New Orleans Jesters in June.

International
Morris was called up to the Honduran National Under 23 Team in a friendly game against Guatemala in September 2007.

References

1986 births
Living people
Sportspeople from New Orleans
Soccer players from Louisiana
Honduran footballers
IMG Academy Bradenton players
F.C. Motagua players
New Orleans Jesters players
Baton Rouge Capitals players
Motagua New Orleans players
Expatriate footballers in Honduras
Liga Nacional de Fútbol Profesional de Honduras players
USL League Two players
Gulf Coast Premier League players
Association football defenders